The Tchula  period is an early period in an archaeological chronology, covering the early development of permanent settlements, agriculture, and large societies.

The Tchula period (800 BCE – 200 CE) encompasses the Tchefuncte and Lake Cormorant cultures during the Woodland period around the coastal plains of Louisiana and northward into southern Arkansas and east into the Yazoo Basin in Mississippi.

References

Archaeological periods of North America